is a Japanese manga series written and illustrated by Nico Nicholson. It was serialized in Kodansha's josei manga magazine Kiss from June 2021 to February 2023.

Publication
Written and illustrated by Nico Nicholson, My Lovesick Life as a '90s Otaku was serialized in Kodansha's josei manga magazine Kiss from June 25, 2021, to February 25, 2023. Kodansha has collected its chapters into individual tankōbon volumes. The first volume was released on January 13, 2022.

In November 2022, Kodansha USA announced that they had licensed the manga for English release in North America.

Volume list

References

External links
  
 

Fiction set in 1995
Josei manga
Kodansha manga
Otaku in fiction